Victoria Azarenka and Maria Kirilenko were the defending champions but Azarenka chose not to participate in doubles this year.
Kirilenko played with Nadia Petrova but lost in the semifinals to eventual champions Sara Errani and Roberta Vinci. Vinci and Errani won the title after defeating Ekaterina Makarova and Elena Vesnina in the final by 6–1, 3–6, [10–4] to win their first ever WTA tier I tournament.

Seeds
The top four seeds receive a bye into the second round.

Draw

Finals

Top half

Bottom half

References
Main Draw

Women's Doubles